Neritum is an Ancient Greek name of an island in the Ionian Sea, near Ithaca and Cephalonia. In Homer's Iliad, book II, Neritum is part of Odysseus's kingdom.

References

Odyssey
Islands of Greece
History of the Ionian Islands
Mythological islands
Locations in Greek mythology